The James G. McAllister House is a historic house in northeastern Salt Lake City, Utah, United States, that is located within the University Neighborhood Historic District, but is individually listed on the National Register of Historic Places (NRHP).

Description
The house  was built in 1915 for James G. McAllister, a businessman who later moved to Los Angeles, California and served as a council member. It was listed on the NRHP December 17, 1982.

See also

 National Register of Historic Places listings in Salt Lake City

References

External links

		
National Register of Historic Places in Salt Lake City
Houses on the National Register of Historic Places in Utah
Prairie School architecture in Utah
Houses in Salt Lake City
Houses completed in 1915
1915 establishments in Utah